Team Korea is the brand name used since 2010 by the Korean Sport & Olympic Committee (KOC) and Korean Paralympic Committee for their Korea Olympic team.

National teams

Olympic & Asian Games teams

 Badminton
 Korea national badminton team
 Basketball
 Korea national basketball team
 Korea women's national basketball team
 Boxing
 Korea national amateur boxing athletes
 Field hockey
 Korea national field hockey team
 Korea women's national field hockey team
 Football
 South Korea national under-23 football team
 South Korea women's national football team
 Handball
 South Korea men's national handball team
 South Korea women's national handball team
 Ice hockey
 South Korea men's national ice hockey team
 South Korea men's national junior ice hockey team
 South Korea women's national ice hockey team
 Short track
 South Korea national short track team
 South Korea women's national short track team
 Tennis
 South Korea Davis Cup team
 South Korea Fed Cup team
 Volleyball
 South Korea men's national volleyball team
 South Korea women's national volleyball team
 Water polo
 South Korea men's national water polo team

Paralympic teams (incomplete)

Other international competitions
 A1 GP
 A1 Team Korea
 American football
 Korea national American football team
 Baseball
 South Korea national baseball team
 South Korea women's national baseball team
 Beach soccer
 South Korea national beach soccer team
 Cricket
 South Korea national cricket team
 Football
 South Korea national football team
 South Korea national under-20 football team
 South Korea national under-17 football team
 South Korea women's national under-20 football team
 South Korea women's national under-17 football team
 Futsal
 South Korea national futsal team
 South Korea women's national futsal team
 Korfball
 South Korea national korfball team
 Rugby
 South Korea national rugby union team
 South Korea national rugby sevens team
 South Korea women's national rugby union team (sevens)
 Sailing
 A team representing the Sail Korea Yacht Club in the America's Cup

See also 
 Team GB

References

External links
 KOC homepage
 Introduce Team Korea

 
South Korean brands
2010 introductions